Lydia Martina Zimmermann Kuoni (born 30 December 1966 in Barcelona, Catalonia, Spain) is a Spanish Catalan actress, film director and editor, businesswoman, author, activist, cinematographer, and academic.

Biography
Lydia Zimmermann is the daughter of two Swiss parents, Yves Zimmermann, a graphic designer, and Bignia Silvia Zimmermann-Kuoni, an anthropologist and textile designer. Her parents met in the United States and moved to Spain. She has also lived in Australia, Canada, Haiti, Switzerland, and the United States. As of 2012, Zimmermann was working on a script of a film that was scheduled to begin shooting in Canada in 2012. Her partner is Isaac Pierre Marcel Racine, also a filmmaker, on whose 1998 film Remedios de Cuba: Scuba Drive she served as editor and on whose 2014 short film Troya she served as executive producer and director's advisor. Her son, Nilo Mur, is a filmmaker as well, and she acted in, together with Racine, and produced his 2007 short film Forse Domani. 

In addition, Zimmermann teaches at the European Film Actor School, at the Pompeu Fabra University Communication Department as an Associate Professor offering directing and screenwriting courses and presenting the works during conferences held at the Escola Superior de Cinema i Audiovisuals de Catalunya, as well as at the Ciné Institute in Jacmel, Haiti. She is one of the founders of the Zürich-based film production company Artisan Films GmbH and sits on the board of the Ramuni Paniker Trust, a Barcelona-based group which aims to provide financial support to talented yet underresourced young people in Kerala, India. She has studied under Jonathan Demme, Lindsay Kemp, and Cesc Gelabert, directed Sergi Belbel's Después de la lluvia and a stage adaptation of Sergio Cabrera's film The Strategy of the Snail for the theatre group Comicastros, and has finished a M.A. at Zurich University of the Arts.

Work
Zimmermann is probably best known for her directorial debut Aro Tolbukhin. En la mente del asesino (2002), codirected with Agustí Villaronga and Isaac Pierre Marcel Racine, in which she also had an uncredited cameo and for which she appeared, together with Racine and Villaronga, on Versión española, directed by Félix Piñuela and broadcast by Televisión Española, on 1 April 2005 and on Sala 33, directed by Àlex Gorina i Macià and broadcast by TV3, on 18 December 2010. She has also, among other activities, played the role of a caregiver in Agustí Villaronga's film Moon Child (1989), her acting debut, as well as the roles of a mourner in Antoni Aloy's 1999 film adaptation of the 1898 Henry James novella The Turn of the Screw titled Presence of Mind, a mother in Gemma Ventura's 2009 short film about Carl Jung The Jung Files and once again in the 2010 film Elisa K, directed by Jordi Cadena i Casanovas and Judith Colell, in which she appears among the acknowledged, and of Ana de Pombo in Agustí Villaronga's 2013 television series Carta a Eva broadcast by La 1. She appeared on 27 November 2014 on the television program Àrtic broadcast by Betevé. She codirected with Agustí Villaronga a television documentary titled Fe about and broadcast by RTVE as part of the series 50 años de on 10 December 2009, and worked as a camera operator during the production of Mariano Barroso's 1994 film Mi hermano del alma and the 2011 film Barcelona, abans que el temps ho esborri directed by Mireia Ros.

Zimmermann's video art, dealing with topics ranging from Andrei Tarkovsky's 1966 film Andrei Rublev, Blanca Portillo's incarnation of Mary during a stage adaptation of Colm Tóibín 2012 novel The Testament of Mary directed by Agustí Villaronga, the Cercle Artístic de Sant Lluc, and fashion designer Jesús del Pozo to Théodore Géricault's 1818–1819 painting The Raft of the Medusa as well as his other work, a 2012 homage to Maria Mercè Marçal titled Ferida arrel: Maria-Mercè Marçal and the personas of Elisabeth Kübler-Ross and Robert Capa, supported by the Consell Nacional de la Cultura i de les Arts and by Banco Sabadell, has appeared at the Centre d'Art Santa Mònica and at the Cercle Artístic de Sant Lluc. Two television films directed by her, La dona de gel (2003) and Perfecta pell (2005), were broadcast by RAI and TV3, and she has also written a screenplay based on Paul Auster's 1995 short story collection The Red Notebook titled Correspondencia. She was also listed in the acknowledgments in Antonio Chavarrías' film Volverás.

Reception
In April 2003, Zimmermann, together with Villaronga and Racine, won the Ariel a mejor guion original and was nominated for the Ariel Award for Best Director at the Ariel Awards for Aro Tolbukhin. En la mente del asesino (2002). In January 2011, she was nominated for the Gaudí a la millor actriu secundària at the Gaudí Awards for her role in Elisa K (2010), and, in September 2002, she was nominated for the Golden Shell at the San Sebastián International Film Festival for Aro Tolbukhin. En la mente del asesino (2002). She appeared during the televised ceremony broadcast by TV3 and titled III Premis Gaudí de l'Acadèmia del Cinema Català, directed by Joel Joan and Adrian Smith. A 1995 short film directed by her titled Wake also won the Best Director Award at the St Kilda Short Film Festival as well as the Best Film Award at the Zinebi and a Special Mention of the Jury Award at the Girona Film Festival.

Bibliography
Agustí Villaronga, Lydia Zimmermann, e Isaac Pierre Racine. Aro Tolbukhin. En la mente del asesino: Guión cinematográfico, Colección Espiral, Colección dirigida por Jesús Robles, 23. Madrid: Ocho y Medio Libros de Cine, 2002, 128 páginas.

References

External links
Lydia Zimmermann's Official Website

Lydia Zimmermann's British Film Institute Filmography
Lydia Zimmermann at Moviefone

1966 births
20th-century Spanish actresses
21st-century Spanish actresses
Actresses from Barcelona
Ariel Award winners
Businesspeople from Catalonia
Film actresses from Catalonia
Film directors from Catalonia
Women artists from Catalonia
Women writers from Catalonia
Living people
Spanish activists
Spanish documentary film directors
Spanish expatriates in Australia
Spanish expatriates in Canada
Spanish expatriates in Switzerland
Spanish-language film directors
Spanish non-fiction writers
Spanish people of Swiss descent
Spanish women academics
Spanish women artists
Spanish women cinematographers
Spanish women film directors
Spanish women film producers
Spanish women activists
Spanish writers in the United States
Spanish women company founders
Women documentary filmmakers
Women television directors
Women video artists